The 2019 mayoral election in the city of Raleigh, North Carolina, was held on Tuesday, October 8, 2019. Former City Council member Mary-Ann Baldwin placed first in the election, followed by attorney Charles Francis. Although Baldwin did not receive a majority of the vote, Francis declined to seek a runoff, leaving Baldwin elected as the city's next mayor.

Incumbent Mayor Nancy McFarlane, first elected for a two-year term in 2011 and re-elected in 2013, 2015, and 2017, was eligible to seek re-election, but announced that she would not seek a fifth term.

Candidates

Declared
Mary-Ann Baldwin, former member of the Raleigh City Council
Zainab Baloch, community activist and candidate for City Council in 2017
Charles Francis, attorney and candidate for Mayor in 2017
George Knott, musician
Caroline Sullivan, former Wake County commissioner
Justin L. Sutton, attorney

Declined
 Nancy McFarlane, Mayor of Raleigh since 2011

Endorsements

First round results

Notes

References

2019
Raleigh
Raleigh